The 1991 LPGA Championship was the 37th LPGA Championship, played June 27–30 at Bethesda Country Club in Bethesda, Maryland, a suburb northwest of Washington, D.C.

Meg Mallon shot a final round 67 (−4) to win the first of her four major titles, one stroke ahead of runners-up Pat Bradley and Ayako Okamoto. All three were tied for the lead at 207 (−6) after 54 holes, and played in the final grouping on Sunday. They came to the final hole tied at nine under par; all three put their drives in the fairway and had putts for birdie, but only Mallon converted. She won the U.S. Women's Open two weeks later.

This was the second of four consecutive LPGA Championships at Bethesda Country Club.

Past champions in the field

Made the cut

Source:

Missed the cut

Source: 

 Nancy Lopez (1978, 1985, 1989) did not play

Final leaderboard
Sunday, June 30, 1991

Source:

References

External links
Bethesda Country Club

Women's PGA Championship
Golf in Maryland
LPGA Championship
LPGA Championship
LPGA Championship
LPGA Championship
Women's sports in Maryland